Hurst Robins Anderson (September 16, 1904 – April 19, 1989) was president of American University from 1952 until 1968, during which he oversaw one of the institution's most important periods of growth and development. He was previously a faculty member of Allegheny College and president of Hamline University in Saint Paul, Minnesota. He received a BA from Ohio Wesleyan University, a law degree from the University of Michigan and master's degrees from Northwestern University and the University of Chicago.

AU's largest residence hall is named after Anderson.

References

1904 births
1989 deaths
Leaders of American University
University of Michigan Law School alumni
20th-century American academics